The Durnholzer See is a lake in the Sarntal Alps in South Tyrol, Italy. It belongs to the municipality of Sarntal.

External links

References 
Civic Network of South Tyrol 

Lakes of South Tyrol